Pasquale Bona (Cerignola, November 3, 1808 – Milan, December 2, 1878) was an Italian composer. He studied music in Palermo. He composed a number of operas, including one based on the Schiller play that would later inspire Giuseppe Verdi's Don Carlos. Bona later taught at the Conservatory in Milan, where he counted among his pupils Amilcare Ponchielli, Arrigo Boito, Franco Faccio and Alfredo Catalani; he was also friends with Alessandro Manzoni.

Operas
Il Tutore e il Diavolo, libretto by Giovanni Schmidt (1832)
I Luna e i Perollo, libretto by Giacomo Sacchero (1844)
Don Carlo, libretto by Giorgio Giachetti (1847)
Il Gladiatore, libretto by Francesco Guidi (1849)
Vittoria, madre degli eserciti, libretto by Marco Marcelliano Marcello (1863)

References
Andrea Sessa, Il melodramma italiano 1861-1900. Dizionario bio-bibliografico dei compositori, Olschki, Firenze 2003, p. 56.

1808 births
1878 deaths
Italian classical composers
Italian male classical composers
Italian opera composers
Male opera composers
People from Cerignola
19th-century classical composers
Alessandro Manzoni
19th-century Italian composers
19th-century Italian male musicians